The New Tenants is a 2009 Danish-American short film directed by Joachim Back. The film won the Oscar for Best Live Action Short at the 82nd Academy Awards.

The film follows a couple who, upon moving into a new apartment, are terrorized by a drug dealer, looking to settle a score with the previous owner. The screenplay was adapted by David Rakoff from the 1996 short film De nye lejere by Anders Thomas Jensen. It was produced at M&M Productions and Park Pictures by executive producers Lance Acord, Mette Ambro, Jackie Kelman Bisbee, Gigi Realini, Jean Villiers, producers Sam Bisbee, Johanne Stryhn Felding, Erika Hampson, Tivi Magnusson, Christian Potalivo, director of photography Pawel Edelman, production designer Janet Kim. The locations manager was Nathan West.

Cast
 Liane Balaban as Irene
 Kevin Corrigan as Zelko
 Vincent D'Onofrio as Jan
 Helen Hanft as Grandma
 Jamie Harrold as Pete
 David Rakoff as Frank

References

External links
 

2009 short films
Live Action Short Film Academy Award winners
Danish short films
American short films
2009 drama films
2009 films
2000s English-language films